Remix OS was a computer operating system for personal computers with x86 and ARM architectures that, prior to discontinuation of development, shipped with a number of 1st- and 3rd-party devices. Remix OS allowed PC users to run apps made for Android mobile apps on any compatible Intel-based PC.

In January 2016 Jide announced a beta version of their operating system called Remix OS for PC, which is based on Android-x86 — a x86-port of the Android operating system — and available for download for free from their website. The beta version of Remix OS for PC brings hard drive installation, 32-bit support, UEFI support and OTA updates. Except for the free software licensed parts available on GitHub, unlike Android-x86, the source code of Remix OS is not available to the public.

Google Mobile Services (GMS) were removed from the Remix Mini after Remix OS Update: 3.0.207 which Jide claimed was to "ensure a consistent experience across all Android devices for all." Later comments suggest that there was a compatibility issue with some apps which resulted in Google requesting that GMS not be pre-loaded.

On July 17, 2017, Jide announced that development of Remix OS for PC, as well as related consumer products in development, was being discontinued, stating that the company would be "restructuring [their] approach to Remix OS and transitioning away from the consumer space".

PhoenixOS and PrimeOS are similar Android-x86 based operating systems developed by other companies independently.

Version history 
There were three versions of Remix OS: Remix OS for PC, Remix OS for Remix Ultratablet and Remix OS for Remix Mini:

Remix OS for PC:

Remix Ultratablet:

Remix Mini:

A Remix OS 3.0 device, the Remix Pro 2-in-1 tablet, had been announced in 2016, however, these will no longer be made.

Legacy 
Due to the popularity and affordability of the OS in Asia, similar projects have been made by various firms. Most notably PhoenixOS by the Chinese-based Chaozhuo Technology, and PrimeOS by the Indian-based Floydwiz Technologies Private Limited.

Just like RemixOS, both are pre-dominantly closed source, with a lot of improved features intended to improve and optimise both OS's for newer applications and PC's.

Projects like OPENTHOS and BlissOS intend to release the project with open source in mind, but OPENTHOS is restricted to only Chinese Markets at the moment, and BlissOS is based on Android-x86.

References

Android (operating system)
Linux distributions